Calvary Baptist Church is a historic church in Jackson, Mississippi, U.S.. It was designed in the Classical Revival architectural style by R. H. Hunt. It was listed on the National Register of Historic Places in 2013.

References

National Register of Historic Places in Hinds County, Mississippi
Neoclassical architecture in Mississippi
Religious buildings and structures in Jackson, Mississippi
Churches on the National Register of Historic Places in Mississippi
Baptist churches in Mississippi
Churches in Hinds County, Mississippi
Neoclassical church buildings in the United States